Çöl Beşdəli (also, Chël’beshdali, Chol’-Beshtali, and Chol’beshtaly) is a village and municipality in the Sabirabad Rayon of Azerbaijan.  It has a population of 1,296.

Notable natives 

 Yavar Jamalov — Minister of Defense Industry of Azerbaijan (since 2006).

References 

Populated places in Sabirabad District